Sjoerd Cornelis Clemens Maria Potters  (born 14 February 1974 in Tilburg) is a Dutch politician. As a member of the People's Party for Freedom and Democracy (Volkspartij voor Vrijheid en Democratie) he was an MP between 8 November 2012 and 23 March 2017. Previously he was an alderman of Waalwijk from 2010 to 2012.

Since April 2017, he has been mayor of De Bilt.

References 

1972 births
Living people
Aldermen in North Brabant
Mayors in Utrecht (province)
Members of the House of Representatives (Netherlands)
People from Tilburg
People from Waalwijk
People's Party for Freedom and Democracy politicians
21st-century Dutch politicians
LGBT mayors of places in the Netherlands
LGBT members of the Parliament of the Netherlands
Gay politicians
LGBT conservatism